The 2000 Superbike World Championship was the thirteenth FIM Superbike World Championship season. The season started on 2 April at Kyalami and finished on 15 October at Brands Hatch after 13 rounds.

Colin Edwards won the riders' championship on a Honda RC51 (also known as VTR1000) in its first production year with 8 victories and Ducati won the manufacturers' championship.

Race calendar and results

Championship standings

Riders' standings

Manufacturers' standings

Entry list

Superbike racing
Superbike World Championship seasons